John Haddon Downes DFC (26 June 1920 – 28 December 2004) was an English Royal Air Force officer and television producer.

Born in Great Easton, Leicestershire, Downes attended The King's School, Grantham. After training as a surveyor, he joined the Royal Air Force Volunteer Reserve on the outbreak of the Second World War. He was commissioned in October 1941. He became a flight lieutenant navigator in de Havilland Mosquito night fighters of No 604 Squadron, and was awarded the Distinguished Flying Cross in 1944.

Following the war, he took up a career in theatre as stage manager for Ivor Novello's King's Rhapsody, later working as a circus producer and ringmaster.

In 1953, Downes joined the BBC as floor manager, was promoted to producer, and developed the live children’s television show Crackerjack, which he produced and directed for 10 years. After the departure of Eamonn Andrews as Crackerjack presenter, Downes discovered Leslie Crowther and engaged him to take-over Andrews' role. He produced Crackerjack in Australia where it was shown on ABC, later returning to the BBC to produce the Basil Brush Show and Call My Bluff.

Downes married Barbara Whiting, singer and actress, in 1951.

References

1920 births
2004 deaths
British television producers
People educated at The King's School, Grantham
People from Great Easton, Leicestershire
Recipients of the Distinguished Flying Cross (United Kingdom)
Royal Air Force Volunteer Reserve personnel of World War II
Royal Air Force officers
Military personnel from Leicestershire